Kandovan Rural District is in Kandovan District of Mianeh County, East Azerbaijan province, Iran. At the National Census of 2006, its population was 8,444 in 1,913 households. There were 8,487 inhabitants in 2,510 households at the following census of 2011. At the most recent census of 2016, the population of the rural district was 7,857 in 2,579 households. The largest of its 35 villages was Khanqah, with 827 people.

References 

Meyaneh County

Rural Districts of East Azerbaijan Province

Populated places in East Azerbaijan Province

Populated places in Meyaneh County